Gary John Joseph Humphries  (born 6 July 1958) is a Deputy President of the Administrative Appeals Tribunal. He was a member of the Australian Senate representing the Australian Capital Territory for the Liberal Party of Australia from 2003 to 2013. He was the Chief Minister of the Australian Capital Territory from 2000 to 2001; and was elected to the first parliament of the Australian Capital Territory, in 1989, later representing the Molonglo electorate until 2003.

Early career
Humphries was born in Sydney in 1958 and was educated at St Patrick's College, Strathfield before graduating from the Australian National University in Canberra with a Bachelor of Arts and a Bachelor of Laws. In 1977 he was elected President of the ANU Students' Association.  He worked as a solicitor, a legal office in the ACT Administration, prior to self-government, and political advisor to Senator Amanda Vanstone.

Political career

Australian Capital Territory politics
Humpries was elected to the unicameral ACT Legislative Assembly at the 1989 election. This election formed the first self-government of the Australian Capital Territory. Humphries represented the Liberal Party in a multi-member electorate covering the whole of the ACT. Humphries was re-elected at the 1992 (again in a single electorate), and at the 1995, 1998, and 2001 elections, in the multi-member electorate of Molonglo.

Humphries variously served in a range of shadow ministerial roles in the Kaine and Carnell oppositions. In late 1989, when Trevor Kaine became the Chief Minister in a hung parliament, Humphries was appointed Minister for Health, Education, and the Arts. He held this position until the Labor Party led by Rosemary Follett regained government in mid-1991. Humphries became the Leader of the Opposition for a short time in 1991, and again in 2001–02.

In 1995, when Carnell became the Chief Minister, Humphries was appointed to the following portfolios:
 Minister for Arts and Heritage; Environment, Land and Planning; Police and Emergency Services; and Fair Trading (1995–1998)
 Attorney-General (1995–2000)
 Deputy Chief Minister (1997–2000)
 Minister for Health and Community Care (1998)
 Minister Assisting the Treasurer (1998–1999)
 Treasurer (1999–2001)

In 2000, Humphries succeeded Carnell as Chief Minister, retaining the portfolio of Treasurer. At the 2001 election, the Liberal government lost office. The Australian Labor Party, led by Jon Stanhope formed Government with the support of the ACT Greens and Democrats.

Federal politics
In December 2002, Humphries was elected by the party membership as nominee to fill a forthcoming casual vacancy in the Senate caused by the announced resignation of Margaret Reid. Reid formally resigned on 14 February 2003, and Humphries was elected by the ACT Legislative Assembly on 18 February to fill the casual vacancy. The appointment made him the 500th person to serve in the Senate.

In 2004 there was speculation the Liberals would reject his preselection for the Senate spot, but he won the ballot unopposed 97 votes to 43 votes (43 people voted for 'none of the above').  Humphries was re-elected at the 2004 federal election with 1.1361 quotas. Unopposed in the pre-selection ballot held on 26 June 2007, Humphries was chosen to contest the election later that year, and was again re-elected to the Senate at the 2007 federal election, receiving 1.03 quotas. Humphries' Senate seat was targeted by online activist organisation GetUp, as part of a campaign to prevent any one political party from having a majority of the seats in the federal upper house. The profile of the campaign was bolstered by polling that suggested that, for the first time, a Liberal Senator might struggle to retain their seat in the ACT.

Humphries was the first Liberal senator to vote against the Howard Government in its 11.5 years in office, when he voted to reverse the Federal Government's ban on the ACT's civil unions law in the Senate, claiming that the Commonwealth should not be able to automatically overturn ACT legislation.

Humphries has served on several Australian Senate committees, including the Select Committee on Mental Health (2005–2006). In 2006, he became Chairman of the Standing Committee on Community Affairs. and is currently the Deputy Chair of the Senate Legal and Constitutional Affairs—Legislation Committee and Chair of the Privileges—Standing Committee with an active involvement in many others.

In 2009, after the election of Tony Abbott as the Leader of the Opposition, Humphries was promoted to the front bench as the Shadow Parliamentary Secretary for Families, Housing and Human Services and Shadow Parliamentary Secretary for Citizenship. He was re-elected at the 2010 federal election, with 1.0118 quotas and was retained on the Opposition frontbench as Shadow Parliamentary Secretary to the Shadow Attorney-General and Shadow Parliamentary Secretary for Defence Materiel in September 2010.

On 23 February 2013 Humphries lost Liberal pre-selection to one of his successors as ACT Liberal Leader, Zed Seselja. This happened with much controversy, in particular over party members, including many prominent ones, being barred from voting. The result was 114 (Seselja) to 84 (Humphries), or 58% to 42%. A re-election was held on 27 March 2013 with a higher membership turnout and vote, but it failed to overturn the result. The vote, 168-138 or 55%-45%, was closer than the first one.

Humphries' term as a senator came to end on 6 September 2013, the day before the 2013 election.

There was much bitterness and controversy in the aftermath of the Senate preselection result. For example, Humphries refused to attend a dinner that the party executive held for him, because of the way that it had been organised. In May 2014 Humphries was stripped of the Margaret Reid Award for distinguished service, a noteworthy party presentation, by the party's management committee. This was for comments critical of the party and some of its members, such as Opposition Leader Jeremy Hanson, who became Opposition leader after Seselja replaced Humphries as a Senator.
One critique in particular, about the Canberra Liberals losing touch with the ACT community,  raised the committee's ire, and drew a public rebuke from Hanson.

A faction called the Menzies Group was organised in response to the preselection result and the perception that the far right of the Canberra Liberals was running the party. Humphries was involved in setting up this faction.
It was active for a time,

but now seems to have receded.

On 14 December 2014, Humphries quit the Canberra Liberal Party. In an email, he told supporters that the Canberra Liberal Party in its current state was, amongst other things, undemocratic, still out of touch with the ACT community, unable to control its finances, and dominated by its far right. Hanson again publicly rebuked Humphries.

Later career
Upon leaving the Senate, Gary Humphries took on a role as a lobbyist with 1st State Government and Corporate Relations. Since 2014 Humphries has been a regular contributor to the Canberra-based RiotACT and to the Fairfax press, particularly The Canberra Times.

Humphries was appointed Chair of the Anzac Centenary Public Fund Board in March 2014.

He was appointed a Deputy President of the Administrative Appeals Tribunal from January 2015.

See also
 Humphries Ministry

References

External links
 Senator Gary Humphries - website

1958 births
Living people
Chief Ministers of the Australian Capital Territory
Deputy Chief Ministers of the Australian Capital Territory
Members of the Australian Capital Territory Legislative Assembly
Liberal Party of Australia members of the Parliament of Australia
Liberal Party of Australia members of the Australian Capital Territory Legislative Assembly
Members of the Australian Senate for the Australian Capital Territory
Members of the Australian Senate
Leaders of the Opposition in the Australian Capital Territory
Treasurers of the Australian Capital Territory
Attorneys-General of the Australian Capital Territory
Officers of the Order of Australia
21st-century Australian politicians
People educated at St Patrick's College, Strathfield